Leptanthura is a genus of isopod crustaceans in the family Leptanthuridae. It was first described in 1897 by Georg Ossian Sars and the type species is Paranthura tenuis.  It is found in coastal waters throughout the world,  and contains the following species: 
 Leptanthura affinis 
 Leptanthura agulhasensis 
 Leptanthura antarctica 
 Leptanthura apalpata 
 Leptanthura argentinae 
 Leptanthura baliensis 
 Leptanthura boweni 
 Leptanthura calcis 
 Leptanthura chardyi 
 Leptanthura chiltoni 
 Leptanthura communis 
 Leptanthura coralliophila 
 Leptanthura diemenensis 
 Leptanthura elegans 
 Leptanthura exilis 
 Leptanthura flindersi 
 Leptanthura geocostarioi 
 Leptanthura glacialis 
 Leptanthura guianae 
 Leptanthura hendili 
 Leptanthura kapala 
 Leptanthura laevigata 
 Leptanthura maheensis 
 Leptanthura melanomma 
 Leptanthura micrura 
 Leptanthura minuta 
 Leptanthura monnioti 
 Leptanthura muelleri 
 Leptanthura murrayi 
 Leptanthura natalensis 
 Leptanthura nunana 
 Leptanthura orientalis 
 Leptanthura profundicola 
 Leptanthura sculpta 
 Leptanthura segonzaci 
 Leptanthura tenuis 
 Leptanthura thalassae 
 Leptanthura thori 
 Leptanthura truncata 
 Leptanthura truncatitelson 
 Leptanthura urospinosa 
 Leptanthura victori 
 Leptanthura vitilevui

References

External 
Leptanthura: Images & occurrence data from GBIF

Cymothoida
Taxa named by Georg Ossian Sars
Crustaceans described in 1897
Isopod genera